John Cornelius "Con" McCarthy (10 February 1893 – 19 June 1975) was an Australian rules footballer who played with Collingwood and Footscray in the VFL. He was known during his career as Con McCarthy.

Originally from Western Australia, McCarthy was a ruckman and started his league career in 1915 with Collingwood. He was a premiership player with them in 1917 and 1919, the latter as captain. He also captained Victoria during his career, leading the VFL to victory at the 1921 Perth Carnival.

In 1922, McCarthy joined Footscray in the VFA in 1922 as captain-coach on a lucrative deal, which saw him earn £10 per week, compared with the £2/10/– per week he had earned at Collingwood. Footscray at the time was a rich and ambitious club attempting to gain admission to the VFL, and it made several aggressive recruiting plays like this to further its case; the Sporting Globe commented that McCarthy was the first "big money" player in the game. As captain-coach, McCarthy led Footscray to back-to-back VFA premierships in 1923 and 1924. When Footscray was admitted to the VFL in 1925, McCarthy was their inaugural captain and coach; he continued as captain in 1926, before retiring at the end of the 1926 season.

References

External links

Con McCarthy's coaching record at AFL Tables

1893 births
1975 deaths
Australian rules footballers from Western Australia
Australian Rules footballers: place kick exponents
Brunswick Football Club players
Footscray Football Club (VFA) players
Western Bulldogs players
Western Bulldogs coaches
Collingwood Football Club players
Collingwood Football Club Premiership players
Two-time VFL/AFL Premiership players